Janet L. Robinson (born June 11, 1950) is an American executive who was the president and chief executive officer of The New York Times Company on December 27, 2004, until she retired on December 31, 2011.

The New York Times
She joined the Times Company in June 1983 as an account executive at Tennis magazine. Robinson was national resort and travel manager of Golf Digest/Tennis in May 1985 and the advertising director of Tennis magazine from September 1987 until August 1990.

Robinson served as group senior vice president for the advertising sales and marketing unit of company's Women's Magazine Group (which has since been sold) since January 1992, vice president and director of advertising from May until December 1994, senior vice president of the group from January 1995 until 1996, and she was senior vice president of advertising. In this capacity, Robinson was also responsible for overall advertising sales at the newspaper.

From February 2001 until January 2004, she served as senior vice president and held the position as president and general manager of The New York Times newspaper from 1996 until 2004.

On December 27, 2004, Robinson was named president and C.E.O. of The New York Times Company and elected as a director of the company.

Robinson unexpectedly announced her year-end retirement from the Times on December 15, 2011, after twenty-eight years with the company. Her severance package valued at about $23 million was disclosed on March 9, 2012, in the company's regulatory filing.
The reasons behind her retirement were undisclosed and fostered questions by business analysts and observers suggesting her departure resulted from personal conflicts with Times publisher Arthur Sulzberger Jr.

Sulzberger Jr. filled in as C.E.O. of the Times Company until the search for a permanent successor was completed with the choice of Mark Thompson.

Other interests
She is the chairman of the Carnegie Corporation of New York, a member of the international advisory board of Fleishman Hillard, chairman of the presidential board of trustees of Salve Regina University and a member of the leadership committee for The Lincoln Center Consolidated Corporate Fund.  She is the chair of the Ad Council Campaign Selection Committee, a trustee for the University of Rhode Island Oceanography Graduate School and a trustee of the Preservation Society of Newport County.

She was on the board of New England Sports Ventures, and was vice chairman of the board of the Liberty Science Center, Jersey City, New Jersey.  In 2008 she joined the advisory board for New York Women in Communications, Inc. (NYWICI). She was the chairman of the Advertising Council from 2004 until 2005, and served as chairman of the board of directors of the American Advertising Federation from 1999 until 2000.  From 2001 to 2009 was on the board of the Newspaper Association of America.

External links
 Bio at Salve Regina University

References

Living people
American women journalists
The New York Times corporate staff
Tuck School of Business alumni
1950 births
American women chief executives
Women business executives
American publishing chief executives
21st-century American women